McDiarmid, also MacDiarmid, is an Irish surname originating from a high king of Ireland circa 657 AD, popular in Scotland.

People
Notable people with this surname include:

McDiarmid
 Archie McDiarmid (1881–1957), Scottish-born Canadian track and field athlete
 Bunny McDiarmid (contemporary), New Zealand environmental activist
 C. J. McDiarmid (1869–1942), American lawyer and professional baseball executive
 David McDiarmid (1952–1995), Tasmanian-born Australian artist, designer and political activist
 Dorothy Shoemaker McDiarmid (1906–1994), American politician in Virginia and Quaker activist
 Errett Weir McDiarmid (1909–2000), American librarian and academic
 George McDiarmid (1880–1946), Scottish footballer
 Howard McDiarmid (1927–2010), Canadian physician and political figure in British Columbia
 Ian McDiarmid (born 1944), Scottish Tony award theatre actor and director
 Jack McDiarmid (1903–1974), Australian rules footballer
 John McDiarmid (tennis) (1911–1982), American tennis player
 John B. McDiarmid (1913–2002), Canadian academic and military intelligence officer
 John Stewart McDiarmid (1882–1965), Canadian Liberal politician, later Lieutenant Governor of Manitoba
 Matthew McDiarmid (1914–1996), Scottish literary scholar, essayist and poet
 Niall McDiarmid (born 1967), Scottish photographer

MacDiarmid
 Alan MacDiarmid (1927–2007), New Zealand-born American chemist
 Douglas MacDiarmid (1922–2020), New Zealand-born painter active in Paris, France
 Findlay George MacDiarmid (1869–1933), Canadian farmer and political figure in Ontario
 Hugh MacDiarmid (1892–1978), Scottish poet, pen name of Christopher Murray Grieve 
 Margaret MacDiarmid (fl. 2009–2013), Canadian politician in British Columbia
 Sarah MacDiarmid, Scottish-Australian woman who disappeared in 1990 in Melbourne, Australia
 Toby MacDiarmid (1925–2003), Australian politician
 William MacDiarmid (1875–1947), Canadian politician in Ontario

Places
 MacDiarmid Institute for Advanced Materials and Nanotechnology, in New Zealand
 McDiarmid Falls, a waterfall in British Columbia, Canada
 McDiarmid Park, a stadium in Perth, Scotland
 William McDiarmid House, a historic building in Fayetteville, North Carolina

See also
 MacDermot, an Irish Gaelic family
 McDermid, a Scottish surname

References

Surnames
Scottish surnames
Surnames of Irish origin
Surnames of Scottish origin
Surnames of British Isles origin
Patronymic surnames
Surnames from given names